The Four Poles is an adventurer's challenge to reach the North Pole, the South Pole, the summit of Mount Everest, and the Challenger Deep.

The first person to reach all four locations was Victor Vescovo, who reached the top of Mount Everest on May 24, 2010, skied the last degree to the geographic South Pole on January 14, 2016, skied the last degree to the geographic North Pole in April 2017 with Eric Larsen, and was the fourth man to reach Challenger Deep in 2019.

The first woman to reach all four locations was Vanessa O'Brien, who reached the top of Mount Everest on May 19, 2012, skied the last degree to the geographic South Pole on December 15, 2012, with Scott Woolums, skied the last degree to the geographic North Pole on April 16, 2013, and was the second woman to reach Challenger Deep in 2020.

See also 
 Three Poles Challenge
 Explorers Grand Slam
 Challenger Deep
 Seven Summits

References 

North Pole
South Pole
Mount Everest
Mountaineering competitions